{{DISPLAYTITLE:C15H21N}}
The molecular formula C15H21N (molar mass: 120.15 g/mol) may refer to:

 8A-PDHQ, also known as 8a-Phenyldecahydroquinoline
 Fencamfamin, also known as fencamfamine

Molecular formulas